Swan Lake is a one-act ballet made by New York City Ballet's co-founder and ballet master George Balanchine  to Tschaikovsky's eponymous music (1875–56). The premiere took place Thursday, 20 November 1951 at the City Center of Music and Drama, New York.

Original cast
Maria Tallchief
Patricia Wilde
André Eglevsky
Frank Hobi
Edward Bigelow

External links 
Swan Lake on the Balanchine Trust website

Ballets by George Balanchine
Ballets by Pyotr Ilyich Tchaikovsky
1951 ballet premieres
Swan Lake
New York City Ballet repertory